Perrett is a surname. Notable people with the surname include:

 Amanda Perrett, English race horse trainer
 David Perrett (born 1954), psychologist
 Fred Perrett (1891–1918), Wales international rugby player
 George Perrett (1915–1952), footballer
 Graham Perrett (born 1966), Australian politician
 Jeff Perrett (born 1984), footballer
 Lloyd Perrett (born 1994), New Zealand-Australian rugby league player
 Lucy Perrett (born 1960), sprint canoer
 Mark Perrett (born 1973), rugby league player
 Peter Perrett (born 1952), English singer-songwriter
 Robert Perrett (1919–1994), English footballer
 Russell Perrett (born 1973), English footballer
 Sam Perrett (born 1985), New Zealand rugby league player
 Susie Perrett (born 1967), sprint canoer

See also
 100596 Perrett, asteroid
 Perret (disambiguation)